51st NSFC Awards
January 7, 2017

Best Film:
 Moonlight 

The 51st National Society of Film Critics Awards, given on 7 January 2017, honored the best in film for 2016.

Winners
Winners are listed in boldface along with the runner-up positions and counts from the final round:

Best Picture
 Moonlight (54)
 Manchester by the Sea (39)
 La La Land (31)

Best Director
 Barry Jenkins – Moonlight (53)
 Damien Chazelle – La La Land (37)
 Kenneth Lonergan – Manchester by the Sea (23)

Best Actor
 Casey Affleck – Manchester by the Sea (65)
 Denzel Washington – Fences (21)
 Adam Driver – Paterson (20)

Best Actress
 Isabelle Huppert – Elle and Things to Come (55)
 Annette Bening – 20th Century Women (26)
 Sandra Hüller – Toni Erdmann (26)

Best Supporting Actor
 Mahershala Ali – Moonlight (72)
 Jeff Bridges – Hell or High Water (18)
 Michael Shannon – Nocturnal Animals (14)

Best Supporting Actress
 Michelle Williams – Manchester by the Sea (58)
 Lily Gladstone – Certain Women (45)
 Naomie Harris – Moonlight (25)

Best Screenplay
 Kenneth Lonergan – Manchester by the Sea (61)
 Barry Jenkins – Moonlight (39)
 Taylor Sheridan – Hell or High Water (16)

Best Cinematography
 James Laxton – Moonlight (52)
 Linus Sandgren – La La Land (27)
 Rodrigo Prieto – Silence (23)

Best Foreign Language Film
 Toni Erdmann – Maren Ade (52)
 The Handmaiden – Park Chan-wook (26)
 Elle – Paul Verhoeven (19)
 Things to Come – Mia Hansen-Løve (19)

Best Non-Fiction Film
 O.J.: Made in America – Ezra Edelman (64)
 I Am Not Your Negro – Raoul Peck (36)
 13th – Ava DuVernay (20)

Film Heritage Award
 Kino Lorber's 5-disc collection of Pioneers of African-American Cinema

Special Citation
 Cristi Puiu's Sieranevada, a film awaiting American distribution

References

External links
 Official website

2016 film awards
2016 in American cinema